Nashravaran Journalistic Institute is the Iranian government agency that handles censorship of international magazines and books.

References

Censorship in Iran
Mass media in Iran
Communications in Iran